Luatangi Li (born 11 May 1991) is a New Zealand born Tongan rugby union player. His position is prop. Li was named in the Tonga national rugby union team squad to play New Zealand and Samoa in July 2021.

Reference list

External links
 itsrugby.co.uk profile

Tongan rugby union players
Living people
Rugby union props
1991 births
North Harbour rugby union players
Blues (Super Rugby) players
Northland rugby union players
San Diego Legion players
Tonga international rugby union players